The Sacred Heart Cathedral also known as the Cathedral of the Sacred Heart of Jesus, is a Roman Catholic cathedral in Xuzhou, China. It is the seat of the Roman Catholic Diocese of Xuzhou. The cathedral is located at 216 Youth Road.

History
Construction of the Sacred Heart Cathedral, designed by German Catholic clergyman Joseph Wu, commenced in 1908 and was completed in 1910.

In November 1987, it has been categorized as a municipal level cultural unit by the Xuzhou Municipal Government. It was renovated and refurbished in 1992. In April 1995, it has been designated as a provincial level cultural heritage conservation unit by the Jiangsu Provincial Government.

References

Further reading
 
 

Roman Catholic churches in Jiangsu
Roman Catholic churches completed in 1910
20th-century Roman Catholic church buildings in China
Buildings and structures in Xuzhou
1910 establishments in China